Pallavoor Bharatharaj Sahasranaman also referred to as P.B.Sahasranaman, is an Indian lawyer, who specializes in environmental laws. He primarily practices at the Kerala High Court but also appears in the Supreme Court of India and the National Green Tribunal. He is also a popular author in Environment Law.

Career
He began his career in 1984 soon after graduating from Govt Law College, Ernakulam. He is also a Notary Public of the Cochin Corporation. Sahasranaman was appointed as Amicus Curiae by the Kerala High Court in cases mostly relating to the preservation of the environment. He was the convenor of a team of advocates who were appointed to inspect the Social Forestry Project and Kerala Forestry Project of the Forest Department.

The report made it possible for the government to make legislation to protect the ecologically fragile lands of the state of Kerala.
In 2006, he was appointed as "Advocate Commissioner" in the famous Chikungunya case related to the outbreak of the virus in the state of Kerala. The report highlighted the failures in proper waste disposal in the districts of Ernakulam and Alappuzha and the court directed the government to take necessary action. In the same year, his report on the establishment of web-based online monitoring system in Jail in Kerala was accepted and directions were issued by the court.

He also appeared for a petition that enabled setting up a basic framework of rules regarding the right of apartment owners on common facilities and maintenance of apartments in Kerala. It brought into effect the right of owners to register their apartments individually tremendously enhancing the saleability of apartments.

He was a member of the Kerala Law Reforms Commission headed by Justice V. R. Krishna Iyer. He was also the Member of the Commission on Rights and Welfare of Women and Children headed by Justice V. R. Krishna Iyer.
Currently, he is the present Vice President of the Sarada Krishna Satgamaya Foundation for Law and Justice (formerly known as Justice V. R. Krishna Iyer Foundation). He is also one of the Honorary Editors of CDJ Law Journal

He has presented papers at the World Bank Legal Forum, 2005, a session on Legal Empowerment and Justice for the Poor, A Focus on Environmental Justice, held in Washington, D.C., USA, on 1 and 2 December 2005. He regularly takes classes and workshops for lawyers, judges, and students in India

Bibliography
Sahasranaman has published various books and articles on Environmental related subjects. He blogs at LiveLaw.in. His latest book was “Green Book on Indian Environmental Law” was released on 4 June by Ravi Shankar Prasad, Union Minister for Law and Justice. Some of the other popular books include:
 Handbook on Environmental Law in India (2nd Edition-Revised) 
Speaking for the Bench. Selected Judgement of Justice.V.R.Krishna Iyer (2012) 
Surfeit of Tribute to India's Greatest Living Judge-Justice V.R. Krishna Iyer 
 Law Relating to Notaries

External links

Direction for Third Gender not an acceptable legal proposition
Environmental Protection in India only through Judicial Intervention 
Green Tax is no licence to destroy nature -Business Line Newspaper
Yale Law School-Lillian Goldman Law Library 
Releasing of the Book by the Acting Chief Justice - The New Indian Express
Times of India on Release of Book 
Simplifying Environmental Law. Terra Green Online Magazine 
Meeting of World Wide Environmental Lawyers in Berlin -September 2014
Are Coastal Regulation Zone norms confusing for public? Experts disagree.
Keralas' Flawed Maps Confusing the public.

References

1958 births
Living people
Indian environmental lawyers
Malayali people
People from Ernakulam district
20th-century Indian lawyers